The 1990 USSR Federation Cup was the fifth and the last edition of the USSR Federation Cup and was officially known as Cup of the USSR Football Union. It was brief and took place between 28 May through 6 July. Its final was played at the Black Sea Steamship Central Stadium in Odessa.

Group stage

Group A

Group B

Knock-out stage

Semifinals

Final

Top scorers

3 goals
 Aleksey Kobozev (Shakhter Donetsk)
 Mykola Kudrytskyi (Dnepr Dnepropetrovsk)
 Mikhail Markhel (Dinamo Minsk)
 Valentyn Moskvyn (Dnepr Dnepropetrovsk)
 Ivan Hetsko (Chernomorets Odessa)

References

External links 
 www.klisf.info 
 www.fc-dynamo.ru 
 1990 season at FootballFacts.ru

1990
1990 in Soviet football
FC Dnipro matches
FC Chornomorets Odesa matches